Protein translocase may refer to:

Translocon complexes SecY and Sec61
Translocase of the inner membrane
Translocase of the outer membrane
See also Sorting and assembly machinery